Exocyst complex component 3-like 2 is a protein that in humans is encoded by the EXOC3L2 gene.

The EXOC3L2 protein has been shown to interact with EXOC4 that is a component of the exocyst complex involved exocytosis and more specifically in the targeting of exocytic vesicles to the cell membrane.

The exocyst complex is important for several biological processes, such as the establishment of cell polarity and regulation of cell migration. The structure and functions of the exocyst complex are conserved from yeast to higher eukaryotes. Endothelial cells in blood vessels express high levels of EXOC3L2 that is required for proper VEGFR-2 signaling so that the endothelial cells can migrate towards the growth factor VEGF-A.

Model organisms
Model organisms have been used in the study of EXOC3L2 function. A conditional knockout mouse line called Exoc3l2tm1b(KOMP)Wtsi was generated at the Wellcome Trust Sanger Institute. Male and female animals underwent a standardized phenotypic screen to determine the effects of deletion. Additional screens performed:  - In-depth immunological phenotyping

References

Protein complexes
Proteins